Djany Fiorenti is a French kickboxer. He is the former Arena Fight Flyweight champion.

Combat Press ranked him as the #10 Flyweight in the world between July 2020 and December 2020.

Boxing career
Fiorenti made his boxing debut against fellow debutant Ion Ursu on October 21, 2021. He won the fight by unanimous decision. Fiorenti next faced Swan Barteau on 5 March 2022. He won the fight by decision. Fiorenti faced Oilyd Akkouh in his third professional boxing bout on October 22, 2022, and once again won by decision.

Kickboxing career
In his debut fight, Djany fought Anthony Mardaye for the FMDA Muay Thai National Flyweight title. He won the fight by decision.

Over the next four years, Fiorenti amassed a 13-1 record, with his sole loss coming in his second pro fight, to Rayan Mekki. He then entered the Wu Lin Feng 2018 60 kg tournament. He defeated Zhu Shuai by decision in the quarterfinals, but lost a decision to Hirotaka Asahisa in the semifinals. Following this loss, he went on a 3-1-1 run, with a notable win over Franck Gross.

Fiorenti participated in the 2019 Partouche Kickboxing Tour tournament. He won a unanimous decision against Yassine Hamlaoui in the semifinals, and a majority decision against Gebril Chaibi in the finals.

He was scheduled to fight Ayoub El Khaidar for the Arena Fight inaugural Flyweight title. He won the fight by unanimous decision.

After winning the Arena Fight title, he fought and won a rematch with Hicham Moujtahid, and won a decision against  Khaiam Khudoiberdiev.

He was scheduled to defend his Arena Fight title against Elias Mahmoudi during AFC 2, but the fight was later postponed due to the COVID-19 pandemic.

Fiorenti was scheduled to face Franck Gross at La Nuit Des Gladiateurs 12 on September 18, 2021. He won the fight by decision.

Fiorenti was scheduled to face Tuzo Cruz at Empire Fight - Vikings Edition in a 60 kg bout. He lost the fight by decision.

Fiorenti was scheduled to participate in a four-man EMP Fight Night 60 kg tournament. He won the tournament after defeating Rémi Parra by decision in the semifinals, and Aanas Azizoun by decision in the finals.

Fiorenti faced Silviu Vitez at Nuit Des Championes 29 on November 19, 2022. He lost the fight by an extra round decision.

Championships and accomplishments

 2014 FMDA Muay Thai National -57 kg Champion
2019 Partouche Kickboxing Tour Tournament Winner
 2019 Arena Fight K-1 -60 kg Champion
 2021 EMP Fight Night -60 kg Tournament Winner

Kickboxing record

|-  bgcolor="#cfc"
|  2023-02-18 || Win || align="left" | Luc Genieys  || Stars Night 2023 || Vitrolles, France || Decision || 3 || 3:00 

|-  bgcolor="#fbb"
|  2022-11-19 || Loss || align="left" | Silviu Vitez || La Nuit Des Champions 29 || Marseille, France || Ext. R. Decision (Majority) ||  4 || 3:00

|-  bgcolor="#cfc"
|  2022-05-21 || Win || align="left" | Clément Adrover || Stars Night 2022 || Vitrolles, France || Decision || 3 || 3:00

|-  bgcolor="#cfc"
|  2021-11-21 || Win || align="left" | Aanas Azizoun || EMP Fight Night, Tournament Finals || Brussels, Belgium || Decision || 3 || 3:00
|-
! style=background:white colspan=9 |
|-  bgcolor="#cfc"
|  2021-11-21 || Win || align="left" | Rémi Parra  || EMP Fight Night, Tournament Semifinals || Brussels, Belgium || Decision || 3 || 3:00
|-
|-  bgcolor="#fbb"
|  2021-10-02 || Loss || align="left" | Tuzo Cruz || Empire Fight - Vikings Edition || Montbéliard, France || Decision || 5 || 3:00
|-
! style=background:white colspan=9 |
|-  bgcolor="#cfc"
| 2021-09-18|| Win||align=left| Franck Gross || La Nuit Des Gladiateurs 12 || Marseille, France || Decision || 3|| 3:00
|-  bgcolor="#cfc"
| 2020-02-22|| Win||align=left|  Khaiam Khudoiberdiev || Stars Night || Vitrolles, France || Decision (Unanimous)  || 3|| 3:00
|-  bgcolor="#cfc"
| 2019-11-16|| Win||align=left| Hicham Moujtahid || La Nuit des Champions || Marseille, France || Decision (Majority)  || 3|| 3:00
|-  bgcolor="#cfc"
| 2019-06-08|| Win||align=left| Ayoub El Khaidar || Arena Fight || Aix-en-Provence, France || Decision (Unanimous)  || 5|| 3:00 
|-
! style=background:white colspan=9 |
|-  bgcolor="#cfc"
| 2019-04-06 || Win ||align=left| Gebril Chaibi || Partouche Kickboxing Tour, Final || Hyères, France || Decision (Majority) || 3 ||  3:00
|-  bgcolor="#cfc"
| 2019-04-06 || Win ||align=left| Yassine Hamlaoui || Partouche Kickboxing Tour, Semi Final || Hyères, France || Decision (Unanimous) || 3 ||  3:00
|-  bgcolor="#fbb"
| 2019-02-23|| Loss||align=left| Franck Gross || Stars Night || Vitrolles, France || TKO (Doctor stoppage)  || 2 ||
|-  bgcolor="#cfc"
| 2019-01-19|| Win||align=left| Abdel Cherragi || Nuit Des Gladiateurs 10 || Marseille, France || Decision (Split)  || 3|| 3:00
|-  bgcolor="#c5d2ea"
| 2018-11-24|| Draw||align=left| Hicham Moujtahid || La Nuit des Champions || Marseille, France || Decision || 3|| 3:00
|-  bgcolor="#cfc"
| 2018-10-13|| Win||align=left| Franck Gross || World GBC Tour 13 || Mazan, France || Decision (Unanimous)  || 3|| 3:00
|-  bgcolor="#cfc"
| 2018-07-22 || Win ||align=left| Vatsana Sedone || Le Choc des Gladiateurs || Le Lavandou, France || Decision (Unanimous) || 3 ||  3:00
|-  style="background:#fbb;"
| 2018-03-10|| Loss ||align=left| Hirotaka Asahisa || Wu Lin Feng 2018: -60kg World Championship Tournament, Semi Finals || Jiaozuo, China || Decision || 3 || 3:00
|-  style="background:#cfc;"
| 2018-03-10|| Win||align=left| Zhu Shuai || Wu Lin Feng 2018: -60kg World Championship Tournament, Quarter Finals || Jiaozuo, China || Decision|| 3 || 3:00
|-  bgcolor="#cfc"
| 2018-02-24 || Win ||align=left| Ahmed Moufti || Stars Night || Vitrolles, France || Decision || 3 ||  3:00
|-  bgcolor="#cfc"
| 2017-11-25 || Win ||align=left| Yassine Hamlaoui || Nuit des Champions || Marseille, France || Decision (Unanimous) || 3 ||  3:00
|-  bgcolor="#cfc"
| 2017-10-14 || Win ||align=left| Nabiyom Tefsai || World GBC Tour 12 ||Mazan, France || Decision  || 3 ||  3:00
|-  bgcolor="#cfc"
| 2017-07-01 || Win ||align=left|  Alex Gonczi ||Gala du Phenix Muaythai 9|| Trets, France || Decision (Unanimous)|| 3 || 3:00
|-  bgcolor="#cfc"
| 2017-06-03 || Win ||align=left| Pulumb Isteri ||Cavalaire Kickboxing Show 2 ||France || Decision  || 3 ||  3:00
|-  bgcolor="#cfc"
| 2017-05-13 || Win ||align=left| Mathis Djanoyan ||  Octogone ||Marseille, France || Decision  || 3 ||  3:00
|-  bgcolor="#cfc"
| 2017-04-22 || Win ||align=left|  Alex Gonczi ||  Simply The Boxe || France || TKO || 1 ||
|-  bgcolor="#cfc"
| 2017-03-11 || Win ||align=left| Islem Hamech ||  Ultimate Fight 3 || France || Decision (Unanimous) || 3 ||  3:00
|-  bgcolor="#cfc"
| 2016-12-17 || Win ||align=left| Deniz Demirkapu ||  The Warriors II || France || Decision  || 3 ||  3:00
|-  bgcolor="#cfc"
| 2016-10-08 || Win ||align=left| Antonin Bohbot || World GBC Tour 11 ||Mazan, France || Decision  || 3 ||  3:00
|-  bgcolor="#cfc"
| 2016-06-04 || Win ||align=left| Laurent Conte || 2eme Trophée Nice Kick Boxing Aéroport ||Nice, France || Decision  || 3 ||  3:00
|-  bgcolor="#cfc"
| 2016-04-23 || Win ||align=left| Laurent Conte || Simply The Boxe - Space Edition ||France || Decision (Majority)  || 3 ||  3:00
|-  bgcolor="#cfc"
| 2015-10-10 || Win ||align=left| Mathis Djanoyan ||  TK2 World Max ||Marseille, France || Decision  || 5 ||  3:00
|-  bgcolor="#fbb"
| 2014-06-07 || Loss ||align=left| Rayan Mekki ||  Gala du Phenix Muaythai 6 || Trets, France || Decision || 5 ||  3:00
|-
! style=background:white colspan=9 |
|-  bgcolor="#cfc"
| 2014-05-31 || Win ||align=left|  Anthony Mardaye || Open des Yvelines de Muay Thai || Trappes, France || Decision  || 5 ||  3:00
|-
! style=background:white colspan=9 |
|-
| colspan=9 | Legend:

Boxing record

See also 
List of male kickboxers

References

1993 births
Living people
Flyweight kickboxers
French male kickboxers
French Muay Thai practitioners
Sportspeople from Bouches-du-Rhône